Phantom Shadow is the sixth album by Swedish metal band Machinae Supremacy, released on 22 August in central Europe, 25 August in the UK and 26 August in the US. The composition of the album is said to be complex and consist of many layers. It was confirmed to be a concept album by the band on their Facebook page.

Track listing

Personnel
Robert Stjärnström – vocals
Jonas Rörling – guitar, backing vocals
Tomi Luoma – guitar
Andreas Gerdin – bass, keyboards, backing vocals
Niklas "Nicky" Karvonen – drums

Additional personnel
Henkka Niemistö – mastering
Ingeborg Ekeland – guest vocals
Chika Forsman – guest vocals, narrations
Bjarte Sebastian Hansen, George Lever, Chris Cook – sound engineers

References

2014 albums
Machinae Supremacy albums
Concept albums